The 2017 Donegal Senior Football Championship was the 95th official edition of Donegal GAA's premier Gaelic football tournament for senior graded clubs in County Donegal. Sixteen teams compete with the winner representing Donegal in the Ulster Senior Club Football Championship.

The championship began with four groups of four and continued with a knock-out format.

Glenswilly were the defending champions after they defeated Kilcar 1-10 to 0-12 in the 2016 final.

C. J. Molloy scored a contender for goal of the season against Glenswilly in their opening group match, though his club lost. Directly from the second-half throw-in, he soloed through the Glenswilly defence and kicked the ball into the net from a distance of around 25 yards.

This was Burt's debut in the senior grade after winning the 2016 Donegal I.F.C. title.

Team changes

The following teams changed division since the 2016 championship season.

To S.F.C.
Promoted from 2016 Donegal Intermediate Football Championship
 Burt – (I.F.C. Champions)

From S.F.C.
Relegated to 2017 Donegal Intermediate Football Championship
 Glenfin

Format
The 2017 County Championship took the same format as the 2015 & 16 championships in which there was four groups of four with the top two qualifying for the quarter-finals. Bottom of each group play in relegation play-offs to decide which team is relegated the 2018 Intermediate championship.

Group stage

Group 1

Round 1

Round 2

Round 3

Group 2

Round 1

Round 2

Round 3

Group 3

Round 1

Round 2

Round 3

Group 4

Round 1

Round 2

Round 3

Knockout stage

Last Eight

Quarter-finals

Semi-finals

Final

Relegation playoffs

Relegation Semi-finals

Relegation final

Ulster Senior Club Football Championship

References

Donegal Senior Football Championship
Donegal Senior Football Championship